Bartosz Bereszyński (born 12 July 1992) is a Polish professional footballer who plays as a right-back for Serie A club Napoli, on loan from Sampdoria, and the Poland national team.

Club career

Born in Poznań, Bereszyński played youth football with TPS Winogrady Poznań, Poznaniak Poznań, Warta Poznań and Lech Poznań. He played senior football with Lech Poznań, Warta Poznań and Legia Warsaw. While with Lech Poznań, he played in the UEFA Europa League qualifying rounds. He was one of the very few players to have moved voluntarily from Lech to Legia, who are fierce rivals, was nicknamed "Judas" and received a violent reaction from the Lech fans.

Bereszyński was sent off in the last round of the 2013–14 UEFA Europa League Group stage, and was suspended for the next three European matches. He did not feature in the second round nor the first leg of the 3rd qualification round in the 2014–15 UEFA Champions League. However, as his club failed to include him in their squad registration for the second round matches, he had not finished his suspension when he came on as a sub in the 86th minute in the return leg against Celtic F.C. in the third round. Legia won the match 2–0, and 6–1 on aggregate. However, after considering the mistake, UEFA set the result to a 3–0 win for Celtic. This made the Scottish team winners on the away goals rule.

In January 2017, Bereszyński moved to Italy, signing a four-year deal with Sampdoria.

On 7 January 2023, Napoli announced the signing of Bereszyński on loan with a purchase option.

International career
Bereszyński made his international debut for the Poland national team in 2013.

In June 2018 he was named in Poland's squad for the 2018 FIFA World Cup in Russia.

Personal life
On 14 March 2020, Bereszyński tested positive for COVID-19, following its pandemic in Italy. His father Przemysław Bereszyński was also a professional football player and currently a professional coach.

Career statistics

Club

International

Honours
Lech Poznań
 Ekstraklasa: 2009–10

Legia Warsaw
 Ekstraklasa: 2012–13, 2013–14, 2015–16, 2016–17
 Polish Cup: 2012–13, 2014–15, 2015–16

References

1992 births
Living people
Footballers from Poznań
Polish footballers
Poland international footballers
Association football defenders
Lech Poznań players
Warta Poznań players
Legia Warsaw players
U.C. Sampdoria players
S.S.C. Napoli players
Ekstraklasa players
Serie A players
2018 FIFA World Cup players
UEFA Euro 2020 players
2022 FIFA World Cup players
Polish expatriate footballers
Expatriate footballers in Italy
Polish expatriate sportspeople in Italy